This is a list of female freestyle wrestlers, in alphabetical order.
 Heaven Fitch
 Anna Gomis
 Kyoko Hamaguchi
 Chiharu Icho
 Kaori Icho
 Lise Legrand
 Gouzel Maniourova
 Sara McMann
 Irini Merleni
 Randi Miller
 Patricia Miranda
 Tonya Verbeek
 Saori Yoshida
 Sarita Mor
 Wang Xu

See also

References

Lists of female wrestlers
Freestyle wrestling